Jere-Matias Alanen (born April 27, 1996) is a Finnish professional ice hockey winger. He is currently playing for RoKi of the Mestis.

Alanen made his Liiga debut for Tappara, playing three games during the 2016–17 season. He played a further two games for Tappara during the 2017–18 season.

Career statistics

References

External links

1996 births
Living people
Finnish ice hockey forwards
Iisalmen Peli-Karhut players
Lempäälän Kisa players
Ice hockey people from Tampere
Tappara players